Weihai Dashuibo Airport  (or Weihaiwei Airport) is an airport serving the city of Weihai in Shandong province, China.

The airport is located in Dashuibo Town, part of Wendeng City under the administration of Weihai, close to Wendeng East Railway Station in the Qingdao–Rongcheng intercity railway.

Airlines and destinations

Airport facility
Weihai Airport is a class 4D airport. The airport is equipped with advanced communication and navigation, lighting, ILS, firefighting, a variety of ground support vehicles and other facilities. The airport has a complete system of air traffic control, maintenance, security, transportation services, public security, logistics and other services.
The airport's facility can handle aircraft up to the sizes of Boeing 767 and Airbus A300. The airport's passenger handling capacity (for domestic flights) is 1.4 million passengers / year, and cargo capacity is 50,000 tons / year.

At the end of 2003, focusing on the development of ports open and the protection of the international flights, the government decided to conduct a comprehensive renovation and expansion. This renovation project was completed in July 2005. An overall transformation of the terminal's appearance was accomplished. 
The new terminal building is shown as whole bright and beautiful, and has become able to represent Weihai's characteristics, and it reflects the grade of the city as a landmark. Weihai airport had greatly enhanced the conditions of service and integrated environmental grade. 
As the government attached great importance, the comprehensive transformation of the Airport Road was completed; it became green, landscaping, lighting after the further strengthen. In the construction and renovation projects, adhere to high standards of design and high-level building; Airport Road had become a bridge connecting the city with the airport's Landscape Avenue.

See also
List of airports in China

References

External links
 

Airports in Shandong
Weihai